Löggulíf (English: A Policeman's Life) is an Icelandic comedy film released in 1985, directed by Þráinn Bertelsson and stars Eggert Þorleifsson and Karl Ágúst Úlfsson. It is the last film in the Líf trilogy and a sequel to Nýtt líf and Dalalíf.

Synopsis
Con artists Þór and Danni operate a pet services where they attempt to sell an international falcon smuggler chickens disguised as falcons. After a series of coincidences, the duo end up being enlisted into the Icelandic Police much to the displeasure of the police chief who is forced to set them loose on the streets without any training or preparation. There they manage to get themselves into incredible amount trouble and need to deal with, among other things, a gang of elderly women, a high speed chase through the city and a drunk at Arnarhóll.

Cast
Karl Ágúst Úlfsson as Daníel 'Danni' Ólafsson
Eggert Þorleifsson as Þór Magnússon
Lilja Þórisdóttir as Sóley
Sigurður Sigurjónsson as Kormákur 'Koggi' Reynis
Flosi Ólafsson as Inspector Þorvarður
Guðrún Þ. Stephensen as Laufey
Sigurveig Jónsdóttir as Hlín
Þórhallur Sigurðsson as Hilmar vatnsveitumaður
Rúrik Haraldsson as Minister of Justice
Bríet Héðinsdóttir as Minister's wife

Production
The film was one of the first Icelandic films to extensively use stunt men.

References

External links
Löggulíf on kvikmyndir.is
Löggulíf on Kvikmyndavefurinn
 

1985 films
Icelandic comedy films
1980s Icelandic-language films
Films directed by Þráinn Bertelsson
1985 comedy films